Altenau is a town in Lower Saxony.

Altenau may also refer to:
 Altenau (Oker), a tributary of the Oker in eastern Lower Saxony
 Altenau (Alme), a tributary of the Alme in eastern North Rhine-Westphalia
 Altenau, a part of Mühlberg, Brandenburg, Germany

People with the surname
 Cornelis Altenau (died 1558), Danish-German builder

See also 
 Altnau
 Altena (disambiguation)
 Altona (disambiguation)